"Kundiman" is a song recorded by the Filipino boy band BGYO. It was released on 7 October 2021 as the eighth single of their debut album The Light. It was written and composed by Akira Morishita with additional lyrics from Jerwin Nicomedez. The track was one of the BGYO songs—"Kundiman", "He's Into Her", "The Baddest"—chosen to be part of The Lunar Codex's "Polaris Collection" time capsules bound to the Moon in 2023. The track peaked at number 1 on Deezer Charts 100 in United Arab Emirates.

Composition and lyrics
"Kundiman" runs for a total of three minutes and twenty-eight seconds, set in common time with a tempo of 78 beats per minute and written in the key of D♯/E♭ major. The lyrics were written in Filipino that tackles about a romantic love but given a modern twist. In the song, the word "Kundiman" was described in two different meanings—"Kundiman", as a genre of traditional Filipino love songs and "Kundiman", as a contraction of the Tagalog phrase "kung hindi man".

Background and release
As the eighth single of The Light album, the snippet of "Kundiman" was first heard in the audio sampler released by Star Music on 29 September 2021 and was officially released on 7 October 2021. Forty-five days after, the announcement for the release of the track's music video was unveiled through a social media post on 21 November 2021, while photo teasers of the BGYO members was released on 24 November 2021 as individual art series which eventually taken from the official music video and was released on 26 November 2021. It was the fifth music video of the group to release since their debut.

Reception
Nino Llanera of MYX Global shared in an article saying, "We can all agree that the "Kundiman" music video brought all the right vibes,..the video was spot on and really captured the romantic and suave lyrics and melodies of this BGYO track". JE CC of Lionhearttv.net expressed in an article saying, "Kundiman is a beautiful surprise as it featured the group's layered vocals". Rafael Bautista of Nylon Manila described the song as "an excellent showcase of the group's vocals... their best performance on The Light album and proof that they are more than just pretty faces".

Due to the public demand, reactors and fans, on BGYO's choreography with their song "Kundiman"; a performance video was released on 17 December 2021.

Promotion

Live performances
On 29 October 2022, the group performed "Kundiman" on the first ever K-pop Halloween Concert in the Philippines—Hallyuween 2022.

Television
On 19 December 2021, "Kundiman" debuts on ASAP Natin 'To stage, as BGYO performed it live.

Music video
The music video for "Kundiman" was produced by YouMeUs MNL, directed by Amiel Kirby Balagtas and written by Edgar Dale Reciña. It was presented in a picturesque with an opening scene in a picnic setup with Akira walking through it, as the instrumental goes on the other boys of BGYO shows off in the frame; Gelo was in the garden while JL, Mikki and Nate were inside the mansion; wearing fashionable outfits taking reference with the Ilustrados with BGYO's visual director—Danyl Geneciran—emphasized  in an interview saying "the music video is a trip to the '70s while also drawing inspiration from French pompadours and Hollywood legends". The solo scenes were shown along the verses while having a magical transition from the reality into art, interspersed with the smooth and sleek choreography showcased in between chorus and mini-dance breaks.

Credits and personnel 
All song credits are adapted from the official music video of "Kundiman" released by BGYO's label Star Music in YouTube, unless otherwise noted.
Words & Music by Akira Morishita
Additional Music and Lyrics by Jerwin Nicomedez
Arranged by Tommy Katigbak
Mixed by Tim Recla
All Vocals Recorded by Jonathan Manalo at The Purple Room Studios
Vocal Arrangement by Jonathan Manalo and Jerwin Nicomedez
Mastered by Jett Galindo at The Bakery USA
Over-all Production by Jonathan Manalo

Awards and nominations

Release history

See also
BGYO discography
List of BGYO live performances

References

External links
 

BGYO songs
2021 songs
2021 singles
Star Music singles
Tagalog-language songs